Rognes is a village in the municipality of Midtre Gauldal in Trøndelag county, Norway. The Rørosbanen railway line runs through the village. The village economy is largely based on agriculture with salmon fishing also being important.

References

Midtre Gauldal
Villages in Trøndelag